The Geary Subway is a proposed rail tunnel underneath Geary Boulevard in San Francisco, California. Several plans have been put forward as early as the 1930s to add a grade separated route along the corridor for transit. San Francisco Municipal Railway bus routes on the street served 52,900 daily riders in 2019, the most of any corridor in the city.

Background

The Geary Street, Park and Ocean Railway began operating cable cars on Geary starting in 1880. San Francisco Municipal Railway (Muni) acquired the corridor as its first streetcar line, opening in 1912. The agency's A Geary-10th Avenue, B Geary, C Geary-California, and D Geary-Van Ness lines traversed the street. Rail service ended in 1956 and trips were replaced with buses. By 2008 the 38 Geary and 38R Geary Rapid constituted Muni's most heavily used bus line in the city with over 50,000 passengers per day.

Proposals

Early plans
By the 1930s, Geary was the city's most congested transit corridor. City Engineer Michael O'Shaughnessy proposed a streetcar subway under the road as far as Larkin Street. A report in 1935 recommended both the Geary Subway as well as a Market Street Subway for removing operations from the surface, but voters suffering from the Great Depression did not have a desire for the $13-million project ($ in  adjusted for inflation).

Marin Line of Bay Area Rapid Transit

Part of the original plan for the Bay Area Rapid Transit (BART) system was a line beginning Downtown and running under Post Street before turning north to run across the Golden Gate Bridge. The subway tunnel would connect to the trunk line under Market Street near Montgomery Street and briefly surface near Maple Street and Post before entering another tunnel in the Presidio of San Francisco. When Marin County pulled out of the transit district, some plans called for a subway only extending to the Richmond District, but these were soon scrapped.

One of the Four Corridors

In 1989, the city of San Francisco approved Proposition B, a ballot measure that approved a half-cent sales tax for transportation. The expenditure plan that was included in the proposition prioritized the planning and implementation of transit expansion along four transit corridors, including Geary Boulevard. Subsequently, the San Francisco County Transportation Authority (SFCTA) conducted a study, titled the Four Corridor Plan, to determine the details of the transportation improvements along the corridors included in the Proposition B plan. The study called for a subway-surface rail line along Geary, running on the surface as far east as Laguna Street and underground to either the Financial District or South of Market. When the tax was extended in the early 2000s, the project was changed to focus on implementing bus rapid transit features along the corridor.

New BART plans
In 1995, the San Francisco Municipal Railway hired Merrill & Associates to study the possibility of building a new BART subway beneath Geary in conjunction with adding light rail on the surface. The estimated cost of construction as far as Park Presidio Boulevard was $1.4 billion in 1995 ($ in  adjusted for inflation). Projections from this study put BART ridership at 18,000 daily boardings, and the alignment would allow for a further extension to Marin. These plans were dropped, according to former Senator Quentin L. Kopp, due to merchant and resident opposition, citing potential blight similar to that caused by Market Street subway construction two decades earlier.

Ongoing studies will determine whether the corridor may one day be served by future BART service. The Geary Subway may be constructed as an extension of the second Transbay Tube.

References

External links
Bay Area Rapid Transit System San Francisco — 1961 map of planned rapid transit in San Francisco

Proposed railway lines in California
Proposed public transportation in the San Francisco Bay Area
Proposed railway tunnels in North America
Tunnels in San Francisco